Gwen Jackson (born October 23, 1980) is a former WNBA player who played for the Phoenix Mercury. She also played for the San Antonio Silver Stars. She was the sixth overall pick in the 2003 WNBA Draft. She attended the University of Tennessee.

High school
Jackson played for Eufaula High School in Eufaula, Alabama, where she was named a WBCA All-American. Jackson was also selected to receive the 1998 Alabama Miss Basketball award.  She participated in the 1999 WBCA High School All-America Game where she scored eight points.

Tennessee  statistics

Source

Notes

External links
Player Profile

1980 births
Living people
American women's basketball players
Basketball players from Alabama
Indiana Fever draft picks
Phoenix Mercury players
Power forwards (basketball)
San Antonio Stars players
Tennessee Lady Volunteers basketball players